Pokrovka is a rural locality (a village) in Karlamansky Selsoviet, Karmaskalinsky District, Bashkortostan, Russia. The population was 47 as of 2010. There is one street.

Geography 
Pokrovka is located 23 km east of Karmaskaly (the district's administrative centre) by road. Sakharozavodskaya is the nearest rural locality.

References 

Rural localities in Karmaskalinsky District